"Friends" is a song by American singer Monica. It was produced by Tasha Catour for Monica's upcoming ninth studio album and features guest vocals by Ty Dolla Sign. The song was released as the album's fourth single on July 15, 2022, and reached number 37 on the US Billboard  R&B/Hip-Hop Airplay chart.

Background
"Friends" was co-written by Rob Milton and Kreion of the group Cousin, while production was overseen by Tasha Catour. Monica described "Friends" as being "about keeping people in their place and handling your own relationships [...] and keep them out of it as much as you can."

Chart performance
"Friends" debuted at number 50 on Billboards US R&B/Hip-Hop Airplay chart in the week of October 22, 2022. It eventually peaked at number 37.

Music video
A music video for "Friends" was directed by Sarah McColgan.

Track listing
Digital download
 "Friends" – 4:10

Charts

Release history

References

External links
Monica.com – official website

2022 singles
2022 songs
Ty Dolla Sign songs
Monica (singer) songs